Mokrosuky is a municipality and village in Klatovy District in the Plzeň Region of the Czech Republic. It has about 100 inhabitants.

Administrative parts
The village of Lešišov is an administrative part of Mokrosuky.

Notable people
Václav Vojta (1917–2000), physician, discovered reflex locomotion.

Gallery

References

Villages in Klatovy District